Messoracaridae is a family of mites in the order Mesostigmata.

Taxonomy
 Genus Leptantennus Berlese, 1916
 Leptantennus pendulipes Berlese, 1916
 Genus Messoracarus Silvestri, 1912
 Messoracarus emarginatus (Banks, 1916)
 Messoracarus mirandus Silvestri, 1912

References

Mesostigmata
Acari families